We the People is a 1973 album by Ellen McIlwaine.

The album was re-released on CD in 1993 along with McIlwaine's 1972 debut album Honky Tonk Angel as Up From the Skies: The Polydor Years.

Track listing
All tracks are written by Ellen McIlwaine except where noted.

Side A
"Ain't No Two Ways About It (It's Love)" – 4:26
"All to You" – 3:05
"Sliding" – 2:52
"Never Tell Your Mother She's Out of Tune" (Jack Bruce, Pete Brown) – 2:25
"Farther Along" (Traditional) – 3:44

Side B
"I Don't Want to Play" – 3:20
"Underground River" – 3:54
"Everybody Wants To Go To Heaven (But Nobody Wants To Die)" (Al Fields, Tom Delaney, Timmie Rogers) – 2:25
"Jimmy Jean" – 2:59
"We the People" – 3:23

Personnel
Ellen McIlwaine - vocals, guitar, piano
Don Payne - bass
Don Moore - bass (Side B, track 4)
Jimmy Madison - drums (Side A, track 2; Side B, tracks 1-3)
Jerry Mercer - drums (Side A, tracks 1, 4)
Colin Tilton - saxophone
Candido - conga
West 44th Street Noise Choir - background vocals (Side B, track 1)
The Persuasions - background vocals on (Side A, track 5)

References

1973 albums
Ellen McIlwaine albums
Polydor Records albums